Go to Blazes is a short 1942 British information film, produced by the Ministry of Information, directed by Walter Forde and starring Will Hay and Thora Hird.

Synopsis

When an incendiary bomb strikes his house during the Blitz, Hay fusses so ineptly with his extinguishing equipment that the bomb burns through the floor - and obligingly falls into a bucket of water in the basement. When a second bomb strikes, his daughter shows him how to do the job properly.

Cast
Will Hay - Father
Thora Hird - Elsie
Muriel George - Mother

Reception
BFI Screenonline refers to it as a "wittily written information film."

External links

References

1942 films
British black-and-white films
1942 comedy films
British comedy films
Battle of Britain films
Films directed by Walter Forde
1940s British films